The Consolidated Laws of the State of New York are the codification of the permanent laws of a general nature of New York enacted by the New York State Legislature.

It is composed of several chapters, or laws. New York uses a system called "continuous codification" whereby each session law clearly identifies the law and section of the Consolidated Laws affected by its passage. Unlike civil law codes, the Consolidated Laws are systematic but neither comprehensive nor preemptive, and reference to other laws and case law is often necessary. The Consolidated Laws were printed by New York only once in 1909–1910, but there are 3 comprehensive and certified updated commercial private versions. The Laws can be found online without commentary.

There also exist unconsolidated laws, such as the various court acts. Unconsolidated laws are uncodified, typically due to their local nature, but are otherwise legally binding. Session laws are published in the Laws of New York.

Publication 

The Consolidated Laws were printed by New York only once in 1909–1910. There are 3 comprehensive and unofficial but certified (pursuant to Public Officers Law § 70-b) printed versions of the Consolidated Laws: McKinney's Consolidated Laws of New York Annotated (McKinney's), New York Consolidated Laws Service (CLS), and Gould's Consolidated Laws of New York (Gould's). McKinney's and CLS are annotated, while Gould's is not. The Legislative Retrieval System (LRS) is published under statutory authority and is available online but is not certified. McKinney's is online and searchable on Westlaw, while CLS is online and searchable on LexisNexis. Commercial versions of the Consolidated Laws are also available from Loislaw, Looseleaf Law Publications, VersusLaw, Lawprobe, the National Law Library, and QuickLaw. Free unannotated versions are available from FindLaw, the New York State Legislature website, and the free public legislative website (which contains the same information as the LRS).

Unconsolidated laws are available in print from McKinney's, McKinney's Session Laws, and the CLS Unconsolidated laws. Online resources include LexisNexis, WestLaw, the LRS, and the New York Legislative Service, and selected laws can be found online on the New York State Legislature website and the free public legislative website.

The pocket part was introduced in 1916 by the West Publishing Company to update McKinney's.

List of chapters 
There are several chapters that compose the Consolidated Laws:

Some specific articles are also notable:

See also 
 50-a
 Laws of New York
 Administrative Code of New York City
 Law of New York
 United States Code

Notes

References

External links 
 Consolidated Laws from the New York State Senate
 Consolidated Laws from the Legislative Bill Drafting Commission
 Consolidated Laws from FindLaw
 Consolidated Laws from Justia
 Consolidated Laws from Socratek
 Consolidated Laws from Onecle

New York (state) law
New York Consolidated Laws